Jack D. Moore (April 15, 1906 – December 29, 1998) was an American set decorator. He won an Academy Award and was nominated six times in the category Best Art Direction.

Selected filmography
Moore won an Academy Award for Best Art Direction and was nominated for six more:

Won
 Little Women (1949)

Nominated
 Random Harvest (1942)
 Sweet Charity (1969)
 Young Bess (1953)
 The Story of Three Loves (1953)
 Sweet Charity (1969)
 Airport (1970)

References

External links

1906 births
1998 deaths
American set decorators
Best Art Direction Academy Award winners
Artists from Santa Monica, California